Dilkash Pakistan is a travel guide television program on Pakistan. It was an informative programme and showed the culture and traditions of different areas in Pakistan. The program was hosted by Ayesha Khalid and telecast on CNBC Pakistan, which is now known as GNN.

Interesting locations covered
 Abbottabad District covered in a documentary TV show
 Deosai National Park
 Northern Areas of Pakistan including Shogran area
 Kirthar National Park and Ranikot Fort

References

Pakistani television series
Tourism in Pakistan
Urdu-language television shows